M.K.M. Abdul Salam (born 26 February 1921) was an Indian politician of the Indian National Congress who served as a member of the Lok Sabha from Tiruchirappalli in 1957.

Education
Salam studied at St. Joseph's College, Tiruchirappalli.

Memberships
 Vice-President, Tiruchy Municipal Council 
 Member, Tiruchy Library Committee
 Vice-President, District Congress Committee
 Ex-Member, Executive Committee, Madras Flying Club
 Member of the Madras Provincial Council from 1952 to 1956.

References 

Indian National Congress politicians from Tamil Nadu
1921 births
India MPs 1957–1962
Lok Sabha members from Tamil Nadu
People from Tiruchirappalli district
Possibly living people
St Joseph's College, Tiruchirappalli alumni